In a rugby union match, each team nominates one of the members of their starting line-up to serve as captain, giving them the responsibility of leading their team and communicating with the referee. Since 1881, the Wales national team has played 722 matches and named 137 captains. Sam Warburton led Wales in the most matches, captaining them 49 times between 2011 and 2016; Warburton also captained Wales to their most victories with 23. The Wales captain to have maintained a 100% record while playing in the most matches is Bleddyn Williams (5) between 1953 and 1955, although Tom Parker captained the side to six wins and a draw between 1921 and 1923. Wales' longest serving captain (albeit not a continuous spell) is their current skipper, Alun Wyn Jones, who first captained the team in 2009. The most recent addition to the list is Jonathan Davies, who led the team against Italy on 9 February 2019 during the Six Nations.

Information correct as of 14 March 2019.

References

 
Captains
Wales